Kaeo (Māori: Kāeo) is a township in the Far North District of New Zealand, located some  northwest of Kerikeri. The town takes its name from the kāeo or New Zealand freshwater mussel, which is found in the nearby rivers.

Sanfords Fishery factory, one of the main employers in Kaeo, closed in December 2011.

History and culture

Pre-European settlement

Kaeo used to be a fortified village pā of the Ngati Uru sub-tribe. This tribe arrived in the Whangaroa Harbour as late as 1770–1775, having been driven out of the Rawhiti area of the Bay of Islands, after killing and eating Captain Marion du Fresne and his crew.

European settlement

Wesleydale, the first Wesleyan Methodist mission in New Zealand, was established by Samuel Leigh and William White at Kaeo in June 1823, then abandoned in 1827 after it was sacked by local Māori. A memorial cairn marks the site of the mission adjacent to the cemetery on the south side of the Kaeo River.

Flooding

Kaeo is built on the flood plain of the Kaeo River and has experienced destructive flooding. It came to national attention in 2007 when it took the brunt of three major floods within the space of a few months - in February, March and July. Water flooded homes and shops and destroyed the primary school's pool complex. The local rugby clubrooms also suffered, and the club received support from the whole country as it raised funds to lift the clubrooms off the ground to minimise the risk of damage from further flooding.

Landslips, fallen power lines, and road closures resulted from heavy rain in February 2008. The Northland Regional Council scheduled flood-protection work for 2008, but as of 2011 it was still waiting on various consents. Floods occurred as a result of Cyclone Wilma in January 2011, and 70 people had to be evacuated from Kaeo.

Marae

The Kaeo area has two marae affiliated with multiple iwi:

Waihapa Marae and Te Tai Tokerau meeting house are affiliated with the Ngāti Kahu ki Whangaroa hapū of Riwhi and Te Pania, and the Ngāpuhi / Ngāti Kahu ki Whaingaroa hapū of Ngāti Rangimatamomoe and Whānau Pani. In October 2020, the Government committed $180,904 from the Provincial Growth Fund to upgrade Waihapa Marae, creating 12 jobs.
Mangawhero Marae and Te Aroha meeting house are affiliated with the Ngāti Kahu ki Whangaroa hapū of Ngāti Rangimatamomoe and Te Hōia, and the Ngāpuhi / Ngāti Kahu ki Whaingaroa hapū of Kaitore, Ngāti Hōia and Ngāti Rangi.

There are two marae affiliated with Ngāti Kahu ki Whangaroa hapū:

 Ōtangaroa (Mangawhero) Marae and Te Aroha meeting house are affiliated with the hapū of Ngāti Rangimatamomoe and Te Hōia.
 Waitāruke Marae and Kahukura Ariki meeting house are affiliated with Hāhi Katorika.

There are seven marae affiliated with Ngāpuhi / Ngāti Kahu ki Whaingaroa hapū:

 Mangaiti Marae and Tau te Rangimarie meeting house are affiliated with Ngāti Pākahi and Ngāti Uru.
 Mangatōwai Marae is affiliated with Ngāti Aukiwa.
 Matangirau Marae and Karangahape meeting house are affiliated with Ngāti Kawau-Kaitangata.
 Pupuke Marae and Te Huia meeting house are affiliated with Ngāti Pākahi, Ngāti Uru and Whānau Pani.
 Tahawai Marae and Te Awaroa meeting house are affiliated with Tahaawai.
 Te Pātūnga Marae and Te Watea meeting house are affiliated with Ngāti Pākahi, Ngāti Uru, Te Aeto and Whānau Pani.
 Whakaari Marae is affiliated with Ngāti Kawau.

Demographics 
Statistics New Zealand describes Kaeo as a rural settlement. The settlement is part of the larger Kaeo statistical area.

Kāeo settlement had a population of 228 at the 2018 New Zealand census, an increase of 48 people (26.7%) since the 2013 census, and an increase of 57 people (33.3%) since the 2006 census. There were 78 households, comprising 114 males and 114 females, giving a sex ratio of 1.0 males per female. The median age was 32.0 years (compared with 37.4 years nationally), with 66 people (28.9%) aged under 15 years, 45 (19.7%) aged 15 to 29, 84 (36.8%) aged 30 to 64, and 36 (15.8%) aged 65 or older.

Ethnicities were 44.7% European/Pākehā, 73.7% Māori, and 9.2% Pacific peoples. People may identify with more than one ethnicity.

Although some people chose not to answer the census's question about religious affiliation, 48.7% had no religion, 28.9% were Christian, 17.1% had Māori religious beliefs and 1.3% had other religions.

Of those at least 15 years old, 12 (7.4%) people had a bachelor's or higher degree, and 60 (37.0%) people had no formal qualifications. The median income was $21,300, compared with $31,800 nationally. 6 people (3.7%) earned over $70,000 compared to 17.2% nationally. The employment status of those at least 15 was that 54 (33.3%) people were employed full-time, 24 (14.8%) were part-time, and 18 (11.1%) were unemployed.

Kaeo statistical area

Kaeo statistical area had a population of 1,191 at the 2018 New Zealand census, an increase of 186 people (18.5%) since the 2013 census, and an increase of 114 people (10.6%) since the 2006 census. There were 405 households, comprising 624 males and 567 females, giving a sex ratio of 1.1 males per female. The median age was 42.1 years (compared with 37.4 years nationally), with 273 people (22.9%) aged under 15 years, 192 (16.1%) aged 15 to 29, 525 (44.1%) aged 30 to 64, and 201 (16.9%) aged 65 or older.

Ethnicities were 65.2% European/Pākehā, 50.9% Māori, 4.3% Pacific peoples, 0.8% Asian, and 1.3% other ethnicities. People may identify with more than one ethnicity.

The percentage of people born overseas was 12.8, compared with 27.1% nationally.

Although some people chose not to answer the census's question about religious affiliation, 52.4% had no religion, 27.7% were Christian, 9.3% had Māori religious beliefs, 0.8% were Buddhist and 1.5% had other religions.

Of those at least 15 years old, 96 (10.5%) people had a bachelor's or higher degree, and 210 (22.9%) people had no formal qualifications. The median income was $21,400, compared with $31,800 nationally. 48 people (5.2%) earned over $70,000 compared to 17.2% nationally. The employment status of those at least 15 was that 357 (38.9%) people were employed full-time, 165 (18.0%) were part-time, and 63 (6.9%) were unemployed.

Education 
Whangaroa College, a coeducational secondary (years 7-15) school, has a roll of  students as of  The principal since 2015 is Jack Anderson.

Kaeo School, a coeducational contributing primary (years 1-6) school, has a roll of  students as of 
The school dates from 1877; it moved to its current site some years later. In 1941 it became Kaeo District High School, taking both primary and secondary students. After the opening of Whangaroa College in 1969, Kaeo School became a primary school. The current principal is Paul Barker.

Notable people
Famous people from Kaeo include Eric Rush, New Zealand rugby sevens player and Heather Mansfield of The Brunettes. Rahera Windsor (1925–2004), British Māori spiritual leader and founding member of Ngāti Rānana, was born in Pupuke near Kaeo.

References

External links 
 Kaeo, Whangaroa Community Development
 Kaeo School website

Far North District
Populated places in the Northland Region